Kunzea praestans is a flowering plant in the myrtle family, Myrtaceae and is endemic to Western Australia. It is an erect shrub with sessile leaves and groups of about fourteen to twenty pink flowers in more or less spherical groups on the end of the branches.

Description
The flowers are arranged in more or less spherical groups of fourteen to twenty, often on the ends of branches which continue to grow after flowering. The flowers are surrounded by mostly glabrous, egg-shaped bracts and bracteoles. Flowering occurs in September and October and is followed by fruit which are urn-shaped capsules with the sepals remaining as erect lobes.

Taxonomy and naming
Kunzea praestans was first formally described in 1844 by Johannes Conrad Schauer and the description was published in Johann Georg Christian Lehmann's book Plantae Preissianae. The specific epithet (praestans) is a Latin word meaning "preeminent", "distinguished", "superior" or "excellent".

Distribution and habitat
This kunzea is often found on gravelly hillslopes of the Darling Scarp in the Wheatbelt region of Western Australia where it grows in lateritic soils.

Conservation
Kunzea praestans is classified as "not threatened" by the Western Australian Government Department of Parks and Wildlife.

References

praestans
Endemic flora of Western Australia
Myrtales of Australia
Rosids of Western Australia
Plants described in 1844